The Highway B-1, Little Telico Creek Bridge is a historic bridge in Caldwell, Arkansas. It is a reinforced concrete bridge, built c. 1918, which now carries Airport Road over Little Telico Creek on the south side of the city. The bridge was built at a time when standards for concrete bridges had not yet been set. It was built as part of a general construction plan to improve the road system in St. Francis County, and originally carried Highway B-1, which was later redesignated Arkansas Highway 1. It carried this roadway until 1964, when the present alignment of Highway 1 was built just to the east.

The bridge was listed on the National Register of Historic Places in 2009.

See also
National Register of Historic Places listings in St. Francis County, Arkansas
List of bridges on the National Register of Historic Places in Arkansas

References

Road bridges on the National Register of Historic Places in Arkansas
Bridges completed in 1918
Transportation in St. Francis County, Arkansas
National Register of Historic Places in St. Francis County, Arkansas
Concrete bridges in the United States
1918 establishments in Arkansas